Iris persica, the Persian iris, is a native plant of Iran. It is particularly known for its beauty and fragrance.

One of the first Juno irises to be described, this species has been in cultivation
for centuries and was listed by Philip Miller in his book of 1732. It was originally grown as an indoor plant.

Description
This bulbous perennial is short, about 4 inches (10 cm) high. The leaves are 0.2 to 0.6 inches (5 to 15 mm) wide with a pale edge and a grey underside. The flowers are 2 inches (5 cm) across, varying in colour from brownish to greenish or greyish.

Distribution
It is an alpine plant growing in the hills of Iraq, Turkey and Syria, at altitudes between 300 and 5400 feet (100 to 1650 metres).

Cultivation
Iris persica needs warmth and shelter to blossom but can be grown in the open air. It flowers in February and March and may flower for up to six weeks in a row.

The beauty of this plant attracted the attention of gardening writers including Vita Sackville-West, Gertrude Jekyll, and William Robinson in his 1893 book The English Flower Garden, among others. Jekyll wrote "How endlessly beautiful are the various kinds of Iris, of which so many bloom in June... in a snug sunny place at the foot of a south wall Iris persica, whose delicate petals of palest greenish-blue are boldly painted with stronger colours..."

References

External links
 American Iris Society: Cultivars

persica
Alpine flora
Flora of Iran
Flora of Turkey
Flora of Iraq
Flora of Lebanon
Plants described in 1753
Taxa named by Carl Linnaeus